XHETO-FM (branded as Romántica 98.5) is a radio station that serves Tampico, Tamaulipas.

History
XETO-AM 1400 received its concession on January 3, 1948. The 1,000-watt station, owned by the Sanabria family, moved to 950 kHz in the 1990s and increased its power to 5,000 watts in the 2000s.

XETO is noteworthy as one of the first affiliates of Radiorama upon its foundation in 1970.

XETO migrated to FM as XHETO-FM 98.5 after being cleared to move in April 2012.

External links
 radiostationworld.com List of radio stations in Tamaulipas

References

Radio stations in Tampico